The 1922 Chicago American Giants baseball team represented the Chicago American Giants in the Negro National League (NNL) during the 1922 baseball season. The team compiled a 45–31–1 record and won the NNL pennant for the third consecutive season. Rube Foster was the team's owner and manager. The team played its home games at Schorling Park in Chicago. 

The team's leading batters were:
 Third baseman John Beckwith - .358 batting average, .588 slugging percentage, seven home runs, 52 RBIs in 67 games
 Center fielder Cristóbal Torriente - .289 batting average, .474 slugging percentage, eight home runs, 36 RBIs in 55 games (Torriente was later inducted into the Baseball Hall of Fame.)
 Catcher Jim Brown - .268 batting average, .371 slugging percentage, 43 RBIs in 62 games

The team's leading pitchers were Dave Brown (13–3, 2.90 ERA, 103 strikeouts) and Dick Whitworth (12–8, 4.71 ERA).

References

1922 in sports in Illinois
Negro league baseball seasons